Jashipur is a town and headquarter of Panchpir subdivision of Mayurbhanj district in the state of Odisha, India. The town is located in southwestern region of Simlipal National Park comprising diverse geographical valleys, forest lands and scores of ancient temples like Khiching temple and first headquarter of erstwhile Mayurbhanj state.

Geography
It has an average elevation of 406 metres (1332 feet). Two National Highways pass through it - NH 49 and NH 39.; Kolkata Mumbai NH and Ranchi Vijaywada NH.TataNagar is 2.5 hrs away from Jashipur.

Demographics
, Jashipur had a population of 14,876. Males constitute 53% of the population and females 47%. Jashipur has an average literacy rate of 74%, higher than the national average of 59.5%: male literacy is 80%, and female literacy is 67%. In Jashipur, 11% of the population is under 6 years of age. Now the local population is more than  25,000. A majority of the population belong to the ST community. Other spoken languages are Hindi and Bengali due to Jashipur's proximity to West Bengal and Jharkhand.Rest population are S.C., Christians, Sikhs, Muslims and Higher Caste Hindu.

Education
Colleges in Jashipur include:
Jashipur Junior College

Schools in Jashipur include:
Jashipur Primary School
Jashipur Govt High School
Govt Girls High School
De Paul School
DAV Public School
 Odisha Adarsha Vidyalaya (CBSE)

Saraswati Sishu Vidya Mandir. Jashipur Girls High School was privately founded in 1965 by local Muslim Business men  namely  late Mazhar Imam Khan / PWD Contractor & late Hasim khan of Jashipur Town. But  in 1980, it was taken over by the Odisha government.

Tourism
More than 5 waterfalls are located near Jashipur. Simlipal National Park is a national park and tiger reserve situated only 50 km. from Jashipur. Jashipur is also famous for Crocodile Park.-which is located  around  3 km away  from the Main market  of Jashipur and on the River Khairi Bhandan. Locally this place is known as Rama Tirtha. In the whole  India, this is the only Crocodile  Nursery  Park under Odisha  Forest.

There is good connectivity to Bhubaneswar, Cuttack, Rourkela and Kolkata from Jashipur. Private express buses to Tata Nagar, Ranchi, Kharagpur and Gaya are also available. Private Taxis are available  on hire basis.

References

Cities and towns in Mayurbhanj district